The 1915 Cal Poly Mustangs football team represented California Polytechnic School, now California Polytechnic State University, in the 1915 college football season.  In its inaugural season, the team was led by D. W. Schlosser and compiled a record of 1–0–1. Both games were played against Santa Barbara High School.

Cal Poly was a two-year school until 1941.

Schedule

References

Cal Poly
Cal Poly Mustangs football seasons
College football undefeated seasons
Cal Poly Mustangs football